Australia competed at the 2012 Summer Olympics in London, from 27 July to 12 August 2012. Australian athletes have competed in every Summer Olympic Games of the modern era. The Australian Olympic Committee sent a total of 410 athletes to the Games to compete in 23 sports.

Australia left London with a total of 35 medals (8 gold, 15 silver, and 12 bronze), the lowest in Summer Olympics since 1992. Ten of these medals were awarded to the athletes in swimming, including the gold from the women's freestyle relay team; six in cycling, five in rowing, and four in sailing. Nine Australian athletes won more than a single Olympic medal in London, while 11 of them managed to claim their Olympic titles for the first time. From the twenty-three sports played by the athletes, fourteen of them contained at least a single Olympic medal. With the absence of baseball and softball at the Olympics, Australia's team-based athletes proved successful in London, as the field hockey teams and the women's basketball team each won bronze medals. For the first time since 2000, Australia did not win an Olympic gold medal in rowing.

Among the nation's medalists were sailor Malcolm Page, who successfully defended his Olympic title in the men's 470 class, and hurdler Sally Pearson, who became the first Australian female athlete to win gold in athletics after 12 years. Anna Meares, who won gold and bronze in London, became one of the most successful track cyclists in history, with a total of five Olympic medals. Meanwhile, Leisel Jones, who competed at her fourth Olympics, emerged as the greatest Australian female swimmer in history, with a total of nine Olympic medals, including one from London.

Medalists

| width="78%" align="left" valign="top" |

| width="22%" align="left" valign="top" |

| width="22%" align="left" valign="top" |

* – Indicates the athlete competed in preliminaries but not the final relay.

Delegation
The Australian Olympic Committee selected a team of 410 athletes, 224 men and 186 women, to compete in 23 sports; it was the nation's fifth largest team sent to the Olympics, but the smallest since the 1992 Summer Olympics in Barcelona. 227 Australian athletes had competed at their first Games, including freestyle swimmer and pre-Olympic favorite James Magnussen, and slalom kayaker Jessica Fox.

The Australian team featured twelve defending Olympic champions, including swimmer Stephanie Rice, who won a total of three Olympic gold medals, pole vaulter Steve Hooker, who broke an Olympic record in Beijing, and diver Matthew Mitcham, who won a gold medal for the first time in men's platform. Equestrian eventing rider Andrew Hoy became the first Australian athlete in history to participate in seven Olympic Games. Three athletes made their sixth Olympic appearance: road cyclist Stuart O'Grady, and trap shooters Michael Diamond and Russell Mark. Beach volleyballer and two-time Olympic medalist Natalie Cook became the first Australian female athlete to compete at five Olympic Games. Dressage rider Mary Hanna, at age 57, was the oldest athlete of the team, while diver Brittany Broben was the youngest at age 16.

Former Olympic rowing champion Nick Green served as Australia's chef de mission. Basketball player Lauren Jackson, who led her team by winning the silver medal in her three consecutive Olympics, became Australia's first female flag bearer at the opening ceremony since 1992.

Australia did not qualify teams in football, women's indoor volleyball, handball and fencing.  There was only a single competitor in men's artistic gymnastics, rhythmic and trampoline gymnastics, and wrestling. Athletics was the nation's largest team by sport, with a total of 52 competitors.

| width=78% align=left valign=top |
The following is the list of number of competitors participating in the Games. Note that reserves in fencing, field hockey, football, and handball are not counted as athletes:

Archery

Australia qualified two archers.

Athletics

Australia sent its second largest team from the track and field to the Olympics outside the host nation.  A total of 52 track and field athletes were selected to the team, after having achieved the required qualifying standards in their respective events (up to a maximum of three athletes in each event at the "A" standard, and one at the "B" standard). Pole vaulter, defending Olympic champion, and current Olympic record holder Steve Hooker was appointed as the team captain; however, he missed out of the medal standings and lost his Olympic record to France's Renaud Lavillenie, after failing to clear the height in the finals.

Australia left London with a total of three track and field medals at the Olympics. Sprint hurdler and pre-Olympic favorite Sally Pearson became the first woman to win the nation's gold medal in the track and field since Cathy Freeman in 2000. Long jumper Mitchell Watt, competing at his first Olympics, became the fourth man to claim the silver medal in that event. Jared Tallent was initially presented with the silver medal for the men's 50 km race walk, matching the silver medal he won four years earlier in Beijing, but he was subsequently awarded the gold medal for the London event after Russia's Sergey Kirdyapkin was stripped of his first-place finish after being found guilty of doping. Tallent was presented with his gold medal for the London  race at a ceremony held in Melbourne on 17 June 2016.

Men
Track & road events

Note: Tim Leathart was selected in the team for the men's 4 × 100 metres relay, but did not compete.

Field events

Women
Track & road events

Field events

Badminton

* Meiliana Jauhari and Greysia Polii initially qualified in the quarterfinal round, but they were disqualified after being found guilty of "not using best efforts" and "conducting oneself in a manner that is clearly abusive or detrimental to the sport" by playing to lose matches in order to manipulate the draw for the knockout stage.

Basketball

Australia qualified a men's and a women's team.
 Men's team event – one team of 12 players
 Women's team event – one team of 12 players

Men's tournament

Roster

Group play

Quarter-final

Women's tournament

Roster

Group play

Quarter-final

Semi-final

Bronze medal

Boxing

Australia qualified boxers for all of the weight categories in the men's event and one in the women's event.

Men

Women

Canoeing

Slalom 
Australia qualified boats for the following events.

Sprint
Australia qualified boats for the following events.

Men

Women

Qualification Legend: FA = Qualify to final (medal); FB = Qualify to final B (non-medal)

Cycling

Australia qualified cyclists for the following events

Road
The Australian men's road cycling team consisted of Stuart O'Grady, Cadel Evans, Michael Rogers, Simon Gerrans and Matthew Goss while the women's team was Shara Gillow, Chloe Hosking and Amanda Spratt.

Men

Women

Track
Sprint

Team sprint

Pursuit

Note: Alex Edmondson was named on the men's team pursuit squad but did not compete.

Keirin

Omnium

Mountain biking

BMX

Diving

Men

Women

Equestrian

Australia qualified a team for the show jumping event based on their performance at the 2010 World Equestrian Games.  Australia also qualified a team in dressage and eventing.

Dressage

Eventing

Show jumping

Field hockey

Australia qualified a men's and a women's team.  Each team had 16 athletes with two reserves.

Men's tournament

Roster

Group play
Australia was in Pool A of the men's tournament.

Semi-final

Bronze medal

Women's tournament

Roster

Group play
Australia was in Pool B of the women's competition.

5th/6th place

Gymnastics

Artistic
Australia qualified a women's team and an individual man.
Men

Women
Team

Individual finals

Rhythmic
Australia qualified one woman.

Trampoline
Australia qualified one male athlete.

Judo

Australia qualified six judokas, five men and one woman.

Men

Women

Modern pentathlon

Based on their results at the 2011 Asian/Oceania Championships Edward Fernon and Chloe Esposito have qualified for modern pentathlon events in London.

Rowing

Australia qualified 13 boats and 46 athletes.

Men

Women

Qualification Legend: FA=Final A (medal); FB=Final B (non-medal); FC=Final C (non-medal); FD=Final D (non-medal); FE=Final E (non-medal); FF=Final F (non-medal); SA/B=Semifinals A/B; SC/D=Semifinals C/D; SE/F=Semifinals E/F; QF=Quarterfinals; R=Repechage

Sailing

Australia qualified 1 boat for each of the following events

Men

Women
Fleet racing

Match racing

M = Medal race; EL = Eliminated – did not advance into the medal race

Shooting

Australia qualified the following shooters.

Men

Women

Swimming

Australia entered swimmers in most events, after having achieved the qualifying standards (up to a maximum of two swimmers in each event at the Olympic Qualifying Time (OQT), and one at the Olympic Selection Time (OST)). 47 swimmers were selected to the team after the 2012 Australian Swimming Championships, held in Adelaide from 15 to 22 March 2012.

The Australian swimmers included the pre-Olympic favorite James Magnussen, competing in four of his individual and relay events, defending champion Stephanie Rice in the individual medley events, and breaststroker and former world-record holder Leisel Jones, who was at her fourth Olympics.

Australia left London with 10 swimming medals, one gold, six silver, and three bronze. The only gold medal was awarded to the women's 4 × 100 metres freestyle relay team. Swimmer Alicia Coutts became the nation's only female athlete to win five Olympic medals, including two from her individual events. Backstroker Emily Seebohm, on the other hand, broke a new Olympic record during the heats in the women's 100 m backstroke event, but managed to settle for silver in the finals. Jones and Rice qualified successfully for the final rounds of their respective individual events, but missed out of the medal standings. Magnussen, however, made a disappointing finish in all of his events, after winning only the silver medal in men's 100 m freestyle, behind U.S. swimmer Nathan Adrian, and the bronze in the men's 4 × 100 metres medley relay event.

Men

Women

Synchronised swimming

Australia qualified a duet and a team, for a total of nine athletes.

Table tennis

Australia qualified four athletes for the singles competitions, and one team of three in both team competitions.

Men

Women

Taekwondo

Australia qualified two athletes.

Tennis

Men

Women

Mixed

Triathlon

Australia qualified six athletes.

Volleyball

Beach
Australia qualified two women teams, one via the Olympic ranking and other after winning the AVC Continental Beach Volleyball Cup.

Indoor

Men's tournament
Australian men's team qualified after finishing 2nd FIVB in the men's Olympic Qualification Tournament in Tokyo.

Roster

Group play

Water polo

Australia qualified a men's and a women's team.  Each team was made up of 13 athletes.

Men's tournament

Roster

Group play

Quarter-final

Fifth-sixth place game

Seventh-eight place game

Women's tournament

Roster

Group play

Quarter-final

Semi-final

Bronze medal

Weightlifting

Australia won 2 quotas in weightlifting.

Wrestling

Australia qualified one quota place.

Men's freestyle

Media coverage
Nine Network and Foxtel won the television rights.
Nine Network showed more than 300 hours of coverage over the 16 days. There was live coverage generally from 18:30 to 09:00 (Australian Eastern Standard Time) and a highlights package from 09:00 to 11:00 and 16:00 to 18:00 (AEST).

Foxtel had eight dedicated channels and showed 1,100 hours of live events, with a total coverage of 3,200 hours. Macquarie Radio Network and Australian Broadcasting Corporation Radio are the radio rights holders.

References

External links
 Australian Olympic Committee London 2012 website
 London 2012 Olympics official website 
 

Nations at the 2012 Summer Olympics
2012
Olympics